Mashang Drompakye (? – ?) was a nobleman and minister of the Tibetan Empire.

After the young prince Trisong Detsen succeeded, Mashang served as the regent. According to A Scholar's Feast, he was a follower of Bon and opponent of Buddhism. During his regency period, Buddhism was banned, Buddharupa were buried in the ground or sent to mang yul (modern Bhutan).

Trisong Detsen converted to Buddhism secretly when he was 20 years old, but he was afraid of Mashang. Later, Mashang was murdered by Gos Trisang Yalag, who was a confidant of the young emperor. Finally, the young emperor promoted Buddhism.

8th-century Tibetan people
Tibetan Empire